Two highways in the U.S. state of California have been signed as Route 40:
 Interstate 40 in California, part of the Interstate Highway System
 U.S. Route 40 in California (1928-1964)